Electropodagrion is an extinct species of damselfly in the family Megapodagrionidae known from a fossil found in Europe.  The genus contains a single described species, Electropodagrion szwedoi.

History and classification
Electropodagrion is known from a solitary fossil, which is an inclusion in a transparent chunk of Baltic amber.  The amber was recovered from fossil bearing rocks in the Baltic Sea region of Europe.  Estimates of the age date between 37 million years old, for the youngest sediments and 48 million years old. This age range straddles the middle Eocene, ranging from near the beginning of the Lutetian to the beginning of the Pribonian.

At the time of study, the holotype was part of the paleoentomology collections housed by the Museum of Amber Inclusions, University of Gdańsk, in Gdańsk, Poland.  It was first studied by paleoentomologists Dany Azar of the Lebanese University and André Nel of the Muséum National d’Histoire Naturelle. Their 2008 type description of the genus and species was published in the natural sciences journal Annales de la Société Entomologique de France.  The genus name was coined as a combination of the Greek elektron meaning "amber" and podagrion the root of Megapodagrion, type genus of Megapodagrionidae.  The specific epithet szwedoi was coined as a patronym honoring paleoentomologist Jacek Szwedo.

Description
The E. szwedoi fossil is fragmentary, with only the upper half of one wing, one leg and the thorax with three wing bases preserved. The nodus, notch on the leading edge of the forewings, is placed  from the base, and the pterostigma is  further up the wing. The postnodal veins and the postsubnodal veins are aligned, a feature seen in Coenagrionomorpha damselflies, while the relatively square and shortened pterostigma preclude the genus belonging to Hypolestidae.

References

External links

†
Prehistoric Odonata genera
Fossil taxa described in 2008
Prehistoric insects of Europe
Eocene insects